Arizona's 5th congressional district is a congressional district located in the U.S. state of Arizona, currently represented by Republican Andy Biggs.

The district contains Gilbert, Queen Creek, southern and eastern Chandler, and eastern Mesa. It is within eastern Maricopa County, and includes most of the East Valley. Its representative, Andy Biggs, was elected in November 2016.

History 
Arizona picked up a fifth district as a result of the redistricting cycle after the 1980 Census. It covered most of the southeastern portion of the state, though the bulk of its population was located in the eastern half of Tucson. It was a Republican-leaning swing district, though a Democrat won it when it was first contested in 1982 before giving way to a Republican in 1984.

After the 2000 census, this district essentially became the 8th district, while most of the Maricopa County portion of the old 6th district became the new 5th district. This version of the 5th covered all of Tempe and Scottsdale and portions of Chandler, Mesa and the Ahwatukee section of Phoenix. Although Republicans outnumbered Democrats by about 40,000 voters, the 5th district was considered far less conservative than other suburban Phoenix districts. George W. Bush received 54% of the vote in this district in 2004 and home state candidate John McCain narrowly won the district in 2008 with 51.70% of the vote while Barack Obama received 47.17%.

After the 2010 census, this district mostly became the 9th district, while the 5th was reconfigured to take in most of the East Valley. This area had previously been the 1st district from 1951 to 2003 and the 6th district from 2003 to 2013. Like its predecessors, this district was heavily Republican.

After the 2020 census, this district, and the 8th, were the only two districts to remain in substantially the same areas. The revised 5th district still covers part of eastern Maricopa County and western Pinal County, including Apache Junction. In Maricopa County it is basically south of downtown Phoenix and the Salt River and east of Rt. 101.

Recent election results from statewide races

List of members representing the district 
Arizona began sending a fifth member to the House after the 1980 Census.

Recent election results

2000

2002

2004

2006

2008

2010

2012

2014

2016

2018

2020

2022

See also 

 Arizona's congressional districts
 List of United States congressional districts

References 

 1998 Election data from CNN.com
 2000 Election data from CNN.com
 2002 Election data from CBSNews.com
 2004 Election data at CNN.com

External links 
 Maps of Congressional Districts first in effect for the 2002 election
 Tentative Final Congressional Maps for the 2012 election
 

05
Government of Maricopa County, Arizona
Government of Pinal County, Arizona
Chandler, Arizona
Gilbert, Arizona
Mesa, Arizona
Constituencies established in 1983
1983 establishments in Arizona